The 1952 German football championship was the culmination of the football season in the West Germany in 1951–52. VfB Stuttgart were crowned champions for the second time after a group stage and a final, having previously won the championship in 1950.

Qualified teams
The teams qualified through the 1951–52 Oberliga season:

Competition

Group 1

Group 2

Final

References

External links
 1951-52 at Weltfussball.de
 Germany - Championship 1952 at RSSSF.com
 German championship 1952 at Fussballdaten.de

West
German football championship seasons